The Big Eyeball in the Sky is the 2004 album by Colonel Claypool's Bucket of Bernie Brains, known by fans as "C2B3," released on Les Claypool's own Prawn Song label.

Reception 

AllMusic gave the album an above average review, writing:

Track listing

Trivia 

 The song Junior was written about the Iraq war and is a critique of the Bush Administrations foreign policy.

Credits 
 Colonel Claypool's Bucket of Bernie Brains:
 Les Claypool – Basses & Vocals, Producer, Engineer
 Buckethead – Guitar
 Brain – drums
 Bernie Worrell – keyboards
 Additional Musician:
 Gabby La La – Backup Vocals on "Hip Shot from the Slab" & "The Big Eyeball in the Sky"
 Stephen Marcussen – Mastering

References 

Les Claypool albums
2004 debut albums
Jazz fusion albums by American artists
Prawn Song Records albums